Mintaka , designation Delta Orionis (δ Orionis, abbreviated Delta Ori, δ Ori) and 34 Orionis (34 Ori), is a multiple star system some 1,200 light-years from the Sun in the constellation of Orion. Together with Alnitak (Zeta Orionis) and Alnilam (Epsilon Orionis), the three stars form Orion's Belt, known by many names among ancient cultures. The star is located very close to the celestial equator. When Orion is near the meridian, Mintaka is the rightmost of the Belt's stars when viewed from the Northern Hemisphere facing south.

Nomenclature 

Delta Orionis is the star's Bayer designation, 34 Orionis its Flamsteed designation. The name Mintaka itself is derived from an Arabic term for 'belt': منطقة or manṭaqa. In 2016, the International Astronomical Union organized a Working Group on Star Names (WGSN) to catalog and standardize proper names for stars. The WGSN's first bulletin of July 2016 included a table of the first two batches of names approved by the WGSN, which included Mintaka for this star. It is now so entered in the IAU Catalog of Star Names.

Observational history 

Mintaka is the westernmost of the three stars of Orion's belt. It is easily visible to the naked eye, one of the brightest stars in the sky, and has been known since antiquity.

Radial velocity measurements taken by Henri-Alexandre Deslandres in 1900 at Paris Observatory showed that Mintaka had a variable radial velocity and therefore was a spectroscopic binary. His preliminary orbital period estimate of 1.92 days was shown to be incorrect in 1904 when Johannes Franz Hartmann using photographic plates taken at Potsdam Observatory showed that the orbital period was 5.7 days. Hartmann also noticed that the calcium K line at 393.4 nanometres in the stellar spectrum did not share in the periodic displacements of the lines due to orbital motion of the star and theorized that there was a cloud in the line of sight to Mintaka that contained calcium. This was the first detection of the interstellar medium.

System

δ Orionis is a multiple star system. There is a magnitude 7 star about 52 arcseconds away from the second-magnitude primary and a much fainter star in between. The system is designated WDS 05320-0018 in the Washington Double Star Catalog, with the 14th-magnitude companion listed as component B and the seventh-magnitude star as component C.

The primary component is itself a triple system: a class-O9.5 bright giant and a class-B main-sequence star orbit every 5.73 days and exhibit shallow eclipses when the star dims about 0.2 of a magnitude, and a B-class subgiant is resolved 0.26" away. At the primary eclipse, the apparent magnitude (of the whole system) drops from 2.23 to 2.35, while it only drops to 2.29 at the secondary eclipse.

The seventh-magnitude companion, HD 36485, is a chemically peculiar B-type main-sequence star and itself a spectroscopic binary with a faint A-type companion in a 30-day orbit. It has an unusual spectrum with H-alpha emission and unusually strong helium absorption lines. It has a strong magnetic field and a very slow rotational velocity that produces chemical stratification in its atmosphere, which leads to the unusual abundances seen in the spectrum.

The 14th-magnitude companion is thought to be around the same distance and is a somewhat cooler and less luminous star than the Sun.

Mintaka is surrounded by a cluster of faint stars, possibly part of the cluster surrounding σ Ori.

Distance
This type of unreconcilable discrepancy is not unique to Mintaka and the reasons for it have yet to be clarified.

Etymology and cultural significance
Mintaka was seen by astrologers as a portent of good fortune.

Orion's Belt

The three belt stars were collectively known by many names in many cultures. Arabic terms include Al Nijād 'the Belt', Al Nasak 'the Line', Al Alkāt 'the Golden Grains or Nuts', and, in modern Arabic, Al Mīzān al Ḥakk 'the Accurate Scale Beam'. In Chinese mythology, they were also known as the Weighing Beam.

It is one of the western mansions of the White Tiger.

Namesakes
The USS Mintaka (AK-94) was a United States Navy Crater-class cargo ship named after the star.

References

External links
 
 Mintaka page constellationsofwords.com
 Mintaka page at Astrostudio
 Mintaka with HD 36485 visible at 12 noon and star C at 4 o'clock

Orionis, Delta
Spectroscopic binaries
Eclipsing binaries
O-type bright giants
B-type main-sequence stars
Orion (constellation)
Stars named from the Arabic language
Orionis, 34
1851
036486
Triple star systems
Durchmusterung objects
025930